Goodbaby International Holdings Limited is  incorporated in the Cayman Islands and headquartered in Shanghai. It is a durable juvenile products company that is listed on the Main Board of the Hong Kong Stock Exchange (1086:HK). Principally it engages in the manufacturing, designing, research and development, marketing and sale of many child stroller, child seat, and other child products worldwide. It operates brands such as Goodbaby, GB, Cybex, Evenflo, CBX, Rollplay, Happy Dino, Urbini, and other branded kids-children's products.

Company for the year ended 31 December 2015, the Group recorded total revenue of HK$6,951.1 million, representing a year-on-year increase of approximately 13%.

Goodbaby International made 10,000 strollers a day under 15 different labels for mostly overseas brands.

History
In 1989 Zhenghuan Song designed a children’s rocking chair and founded Goodbaby International. In 1990 chairman Zhenghuan Song establishes R&D center in Kunshan, and in 1999, the companies becomes the largest supplier of strollers in North America.

Going Public

In 2011 the company goes public on the Hong Kong stock exchange. Ticker (HKEx: 01086)

Acquisitions & Growth

In January 2014, Goodbaby International acquired Cybex. Goodbaby anticipated not only to extend the product portfolio into premium car safety seats and reinforce our footing in Europe, but also use Cybex's unique and extensive experience in branding and marketing.

In July 2014 Goodbaby International acquired Evenflo, one of the largest U.S. makers of strollers.

Products
Goodbaby International's core products include car seats, strollers, and other baby products.

References

External links
Goodbaby International (parent company website)
Forbes Interview with Founder Song Zhenghuan

Infant products companies
Babycare
Infancy